Giorgia Villa (born 23 February 2003) is an Italian artistic gymnast. She was a member of the historic team that won bronze at the 2019 World Championships in Stuttgart, and was part of the gold-winning team at both the 2022 Mediterranean Games and the 2022 European Championships. Individually, she is the 2018, 2020, and 2021 Italian national champion, the 2018 Youth Olympic champion, and the 2018 European junior all-around and beam champion. She is also a member of the Italian national team.

Early life 
Giorgia Villa was born in Ponte San Pietro, Italy on February 23, 2003. She started gymnastics when she was four.  In 2010 she moved to Brescia to train at the International Academy of Brixia, the same gym Vanessa Ferrari trained at.

Gymnastics career

Junior

2015–2017 
Villa made her international debut at the 2015 City of Jesolo Trophy as part of Italy's Young Dreams team alongside Asia and Alice D'Amato.

In 2017 Villa competed at the City of Jesolo Trophy. During her floor exercise routine she tore her achilles tendon and was unable to finish the competition. Villa later competed at the Italian National Championships where she placed first on uneven bars, the only event she competed on.

2018 
Villa competed at the City of Jesolo Trophy in April. Italy placed first in the team competition, and individually Villa placed second in the all-around behind Vladislava Urazova of Russia, and fourth on vault and uneven bars. Villa competed at the 2018 European Women's Artistic Gymnastics Championships alongside Asia D'Amato, Alice D'Amato, Alessia Federici, and Elisa Iorio where Italy won team gold. Individually Villa won all-around and balance beam gold (ahead of Amelie Morgan of Great Britain), and vault and floor exercise silver, behind teammate Asia D'Amato and Romanian Ioana Stănciulescu respectively.

She was later selected to represent Italy at the 2018 Youth Olympics in Buenos Aires, Argentina. At the Youth Olympic Games she qualified to every event final, qualifying first on uneven bars and vault, second in the individual all-around and on floor exercise (behind Anastasia Bachynska of Ukraine), and seventh on balance beam. In the all-around final she was able to win the gold medal after top qualifier Bachynksa suffered mistakes on both balance beam and floor exercise. She was also the first all-around champion since the Youth Olympic Games inception that was not from Russia. She continued her strong performances into the event finals, winning gold on vault and floor exercise, ahead of Csenge Bácskay of Hungary and Morgan respectively, silver on uneven bars behind Russian Ksenia Klimenko, and finishing fourth on balance beam.  Villa was selected as Italy's flag bearer for the closing ceremony.

Senior

2019 
Villa made her senior debut at the 1st Italian Serie A competition.  She finished first in the team and all-around and scored highest on balance beam and second highest on vault, behind Alice D'Amato.  She was slated to make her senior international debut at the 2019 City of Jesolo Trophy but had to withdraw at the last minute due to an injury to the middle finger of the right hand.  It was later revealed that she broke her finger and would therefore have limited training leading up to the 2019 European Championships in April.  In late March Villa competed at the 2nd Italian Serie A, but she only competed on uneven bars where she recorded the highest score.

In April Villa was officially named to the team to compete at the 2019 European Championships alongside Iorio and the D'Amato twins.  Villa qualified to the all-around final in seventh place after falling off the uneven bars and qualified to the balance beam final in first. In the all-around final she managed sixth after making mistakes on bars and floor and falling on beam, and in the balance beam final another fall took her out of medal contention.

In May Villa competed at the 3rd Italian Serie A where she placed first in the all-around and on vault, uneven bars, and balance beam.  In August Villa competed at the Heerenveen Friendly where she helped Italy win gold in the team competition ahead of the Netherlands and Norway, and individually she won gold in the all-around despite falling on the uneven bars, finishing ahead of Eythora Thorsdottir.  Additionally she recorded the highest balance beam score and the second highest vault and floor exercise scores.  On September 4 Villa was named to the team to compete at the 2019 World Championships in Stuttgart, Germany alongside Alice D'Amato, Asia D'Amato, Elisa Iorio, and Desiree Carofiglio.

During qualifications at the World Championships Villa helped Italy qualify to the team final in eighth place; as a result Italy also qualified to the 2020 Olympic Games in Tokyo.  Individually she qualified to the all-around final in twelfth place. In the team final, Villa competed on all four events to lead Italy to a surprise bronze medal – Italy's first team medal since the 1950 World Artistic Gymnastics Championships. They ended up finishing behind the United States, winning their fifth consecutive title, and Russia but finished ahead of China, who originally qualified to the final in second place.  During the all-around Villa finished in sixteenth place after falling off of the balance beam.  She received the fourth highest score on vault behind Simone Biles of the United States, Aline Friess of France, and Giulia Steingruber of Switzerland and the fifth highest score on uneven bars behind Nina Derwael of Belgium, Elisabeth Seitz of Germany, Biles, and Tang Xijing of China.

2020 
In January it was announced that Villa would represent Italy at the American Cup in March 2020.  The following month it was announced that Villa would also represent Italy at the Tokyo World Cup taking place on April 4.  At the American Cup Villa finished in seventh place after falling on the uneven bars, balance beam, and on floor exercise.  The Tokyo World Cup was later canceled due to the COVID-19 pandemic in Japan.

In November Villa competed at the Italian National Championships.  She tied for first with Asia D'Amato after she fell on her vault.  During event finals she won her fourth consecutive gold on the uneven bars, won silver on balance beam behind Martina Maggio, and gold on floor exercise.

2021 
In April Villa was selected to represent Italy at the European Championships in Basel alongside Alice D'Amato, Martina Maggio, and Vanessa Ferrari.  During qualifications Villa only competed on the uneven bars and balance beam.  Although she fell off the balance beam, she was able to qualify to the uneven bars event final. During the event final she finished in fourth place behind Angelina Melnikova, Vladislava Urazova, and Amelie Morgan.

In late June Villa competed at the Flanders International Team Challenge where she helped Italy place third.  Individually she placed fifth in the all-around but won gold on balance beam and bronze on the uneven bars.  Villa was named to the team to represent Italy at the 2020 Summer Olympics alongside Alice and Asia D'Amato and Martina Maggio.

Villa won her third national all-around title in July; however she injured her ankle during floor exercise and was unable to compete at the Olympic Games.

2022 
Villa competed at the DTB Pokal Team Challenge.  Her scores on uneven bars and balance beam contributed towards Italy's second-place finish.  Individually she won gold on uneven bars.  Villa next competed at the City of Jesolo Trophy.  She helped Italy finish second as a team and individually placed third on the uneven bars.  In June Villa competed at the Mediterranean Games alongside Martina Maggio, Alice D'Amato, Asia D'Amato, and Angela Andreoli.  Together they won gold in the team competition, over five points ahead of second place France.  In August Villa competed at the European Championships.  She contributed scores on uneven bars and balance beam towards Italy's first place finish.  During event finals Villa placed fourth and seventh on uneven bars and balance beam respectively.

In October Villa competed at the Italian National Championships.  She made her return to the all-around for the first time since the previous year's national championships; she placed fourth.  During event finals she co-won the uneven bars title alongside Maggio and placed third on balance beam.  Villa was later named to the team to compete at the World Championships in Liverpool alongside Alice D'Amato, Martina Maggio, Manila Esposito, Veronica Mandriota, and alternate Elisa Iorio.

2023 
Villa competed at the Baku World Cup where she finished second on uneven bars and first on balance beam.

Competitive history

References

External links

 

2003 births
Living people
Italian female artistic gymnasts
Medalists at the World Artistic Gymnastics Championships
European champions in gymnastics
Youth Olympic gold medalists for Italy
Gymnasts at the 2018 Summer Youth Olympics
Sportspeople from the Province of Bergamo
People from Ponte San Pietro
Mediterranean Games gold medalists for Italy
Mediterranean Games medalists in gymnastics
Gymnasts at the 2022 Mediterranean Games
21st-century Italian women